Bowling Green is a hamlet in Cornwall, England, UK.

References

Hamlets in Cornwall